Zavrelimyia is a genus of non-biting midges in the subfamily Tanypodinae of the  family Chironomidae.

References

Tanypodinae